Terin may refer to:

 Terin Humphrey (born 1986), American retired artistic gymnast
 Terín, nickname of Juan Pizarro (baseball) (1937–2021), Major League Baseball pitcher from Puerto Rico
 Therinus (died 3rd century), spelled Terin in Albanian, Christian saint